Strumigenys metazytes is a species of ant that has a distinct diastema on the basal portion of the mandibles with 4 sharp teeth and the species has small hairs. The species was described by Bolton in 2000.

External links

 Miss. Entomological Museum

Myrmicinae
Insects described in 2000